The hill size (HS) is the most important measurement for the size of a ski jumping hill. It is defined as the distance between the takeoff table and the end of the landing area, which is called hill size point. It is not measured as a straight line but on the surface of the hill.

In 2004, the hill size became the official measurement for the size of hills, replacing the construction point (K-point, formerly known as the critical point), which however remains the basis for issuing points.

The world's largest hills are Vikersundbakken in Vikersund, Norway and Letalnica Bratov Gorišek in Planica, Slovenia with hill size of 240 meters.  The hills normally mark the hill size physically with a horizontal line across the hill.

Classification
Ski jumping hills ar classified by hill size as follows:

Nearly all competitions in the FIS Ski Jumping World Cup use large hills and ski-flying hills, with the largest being Mühlenkopfschanze in Germany. In addition, there is a bi-annual FIS Ski-Flying World Championships, which is held in one of the world's five ski flying hills: Vikersundbakken in Norway, Letalnica Bratov Gorišek in Slovenia, Čerťák in the Czech Republic, Heini Klopfer Ski Jump in Germany and Kulm in Austria. These all have a hill size of at least 185. In the FIS Ski Jumping Continental Cup, and FIS Women's Ski Jumping Continental Cup, both normal and large hills are used. In the Winter Olympics, there is one competition in the normal hill, one in the large hill, and a team competition in the large hill.

References

Ski jumping